Chowgacha is an upazila of Jessore District in the Division of Khulna, Bangladesh.

History
There is a long history behind Chowgacha. It is named after the four banyan tree beside the Chowgacha. This is the first place in Bangladesh to get its freedom during the liberation war in 1971. Chawgachha got its victory on 6 December 1971.

Geography
The main city is on the bank of the river Kopothakho River. It has a total area of 269.31 km2.

Chaugachha Upazila is bounded by Maheshpur, Kotchandpur and Kaliganj upazilas on the north, Jessore Sadar and Kaliganj upazilas on the east, Sarsha and Jhikargachha upazilas and Bagdah community development block in North 24 Parganas district in West Bengal, India on the south and Maheshpur Upazila on the west.

Demographics
According to the 2011 Bangladesh census, Chaugachha had a population of 231,370. Males constituted 50.10% of the population and females 49.90%. Muslims formed 92.48% of the population, Hindus 7.49%, Christians 0.01% and others 0.02%. Chaugachha had a literacy rate of 53.7% for the population 7 years and above.

As of the 1991 Bangladesh census, Chowgacha Upazila had a population of 189,829. Males constituted 51.6% of the population, and females 48.4%; 91,297 of the population were aged 18 or over. Chowgacha had an average literacy rate of 25.5% (7+ years), against the national average of 32.4% literate.

Points of interest
Nilkuthi, Muktinagar, Bergobindopur Baor, Kharincha Baor, Jagdishpur Tula Firm, Kopotakkho Nod.

Administration
Chaugachha Upazila is divided into Chaugachha Municipality and 11 union parishads: Chaugachha, Dhuliani, Hakimpur, Jagadishpur, Narayanpur, Pashapole, Patibila, Phulsara, Singhajhuli, Sukpukhuria, and Swarupdaha. The union parishads are subdivided into 150 mauzas and 154 villages.

Chaugachha Municipality is subdivided into 9 wards and 11 mahallas.

Principal, Mostanichur Rahman is the Upazila Chairman (2019 – present) of Chawgachha.

Notable residents
 Shaheed Mashiur Rahman, lawyer, politician, and martyr in the War of Liberation, was born in Singhajhuli village in 1920.

See also
Upazilas of Bangladesh
Districts of Bangladesh
Divisions of Bangladesh

References

Upazilas of Jessore District
Jashore District
Khulna Division